This is a list of the longest Indian films.

List

Films released in multiple parts 
This section lists films conceived as an artistic unity and produced simultaneously, or consecutively with no significant interruption or change of production team, even though they were released with separate premières.

See also 
 List of multilingual Indian films
 Pan-Indian film

References 

Lists of Indian films
Top film lists
Indian superlatives